Altrichter is a surname. Notable people with the surname include:

 Friedrich Altrichter (1890-1948), German officer
 Petr Altrichter (born 1951), Czech conductor

German-language surnames